Azad bey Vazirov (22 August 1869, in Shusha, Russian Empire – 1921 in Qazvin, Qajar Empire) was Azerbaijani military officer, colonel. Father of the Soviet statesman, organizer of the oil industry, Hero of Socialist Labour Suleyman Vazirov.

Life 
Descended "from the nobility family of the city of Shusha". He entered the service as a volunteer in the 43rd Tver Dragoon Regiment. December 20, 1888 was sent to the Elisavetgrad Cavalry School. After graduating from military college in the second category on July 3, 1892, he was promoted to standard junker and returned to the regiment. On June 27, 1893, he was promoted to cornet with enrollment in the reserve. In 1901 cornet Vazirov was appointed adjutant of the Dagestan Cavalry Regiment. Since October 27, 1901, he got the rank of Poruchik, Staff captain (27.10.1905), Rittmeister (10/27/1909) in the Imperial Russian Army.

He also served in the Ministry of Internal Affairs of Russian Empire as a senior chief officer for assignments under the Baku Governor (on September 1, 1916). In 1917, he was promoted to the rank of lieutenant colonel.

He served in the army of the Azerbaijan Democratic Republic. In late 1918 and early 1919, Lieutenant Colonel Vezirov served as the Ganja military commander, then as the commandant of the city of Baku. By order of the government of the Azerbaijan Democratic Republic No. 28 dated June 25, 1919, he was promoted to colonel. Also he served in the Red Army. Azad bey Bazirov died in Qazvin in 1921.

Family 
Azad bey married Karim bey Mehmandarov's daughter Zahra. They had sons named Isa Bey, Musa Bey, Suleyman Vazirov, Isa Bey (the second), daughters named Kheyransa Khanum, Goncha Khanum and Gulrukh Khanum.

Awards 
  - 3rd Class Order of Saint Stanislaus (1879)
  - 3rd Class Order of Saint Anne (1881)

References

Footnotes

Works cited 
 

1869 births
1921 deaths
Azerbaijani nobility
Military personnel from Shusha
Vazirovs
Recipients of the Order of St. Anna, 3rd class
Recipients of the Order of Saint Stanislaus (Russian), 3rd class